The canton of Pertuis is a French administrative division in the department of Vaucluse and region Provence-Alpes-Côte d'Azur.

Composition 
At the French canton reorganisation which came into effect in March 2015, the canton was expanded from 14 to 15 communes:

Ansouis
La Bastide-des-Jourdans
La Bastidonne
Beaumont-de-Pertuis
Cabrières-d'Aigues
Grambois
Mirabeau
La Motte-d'Aigues
Pertuis
Peypin-d'Aigues
Saint-Martin-de-la-Brasque
Sannes
La Tour-d'Aigues
Villelaure
Vitrolles-en-Luberon

References

Pertuis